Peter Martin, known professionally as Petey, is a musician and social media personality from Detroit, Michigan, who rose to prominence on TikTok during the COVID-19 pandemic. He has more than 1.4 million followers on the social media platform, and has released two studio albums on Terrible Records Terrible label.

Early life 

A native of Chicago, Martin played with emo band Young Jesus and attended Loyola University before moving to California in 2013, where for a time he lived in a hand-made tent in a friend's backyard.

Musical career 

Petey was signed to Terrible in 2020, and has released two albums and several standalone singles with the label. In 2022 he embarked on a US tour, including playing festivals such as Lollapalooza and Outside Lands. In March 2022 he released a short film called Lean Into Life, based on his 2021 album of the same name, Directed by Director Crane.

Comedy 

Martin's TikToks, created together with his friend and manager Will Crane (known sometimes as Director Crane), have been described as "wholesome" and "absurd", and feature him playing multiple characters, using many quick cuts to stitch the skits together. Martin began making sketches on TikTok when his nascent career in music was disrupted by the COVID-19 pandemic and has parlayed his popularity on the platform into sponsorship deals and collaborations with other figures like Fred Durst.

Discography

 Other Stuff (2021, Terrible Records)
 Lean Into Life (2021, Terrible Records)

References

External links
 Website
 Petey on Apple Music
 TikTok channel

Living people
21st-century American singers
American TikTokers
American rock singers
American rock songwriters
Loyola University New Orleans alumni
1992 births